Xenia Goodwin (born 7 February 1994) is an Australian actress and dancer. Goodwin is known for her starring role as Tara Webster, a dance student, on the Australian Broadcasting Corporation television series Dance Academy, which was her first on-screen appearance. She had a guest role on The Jesters in 2011. Goodwin has studied dance at the Tanya Pearson Classical Coaching Academy and the Valerie Jenkins Academy of Ballet.

Personal life 

In July 2019, Goodwin was in a near-fatal car accident while in Zakynthos, Greece. The accident, which nearly left her a quadriplegic, fractured all but 4 of her vertebrae and required major surgery without painkillers.

Filmography

References

External links 

Australian female dancers
Australian television actresses
Actresses from Sydney
1994 births
Living people
21st-century Australian dancers
21st-century Australian actresses